The Apostolic Nunciature to Greece is an ecclesiastical office of the Catholic Church in Greece. It is a diplomatic post of the Holy See, whose representative is called the Apostolic Nuncio with the rank of an ambassador.

Representatives of the Holy See to Greece
Ioannis Marangos (9 June 1874 - 17 December 1891)
Antonios Delenda (22 August 1900 - 10 September 1911)
Louis Petit (4 March 1912 - 24 June 1926)
Carlo Margotti (12 February 1931 - 25 July 1934)
Angelo Giuseppe Roncalli (30 November 1934 - 22 December 1944)
Giovanni Mariani (25 April 1980 - 5 May 1990)
Luciano Storero (28 June 1990 - 15 November 1995)
Paul Fouad Naïm Tabet (2 January 1996 - 25 January 2005)
Patrick Coveney (25 January 2005 - 16 July 2009)
Luigi Gatti (16 July 2009 - 22 February 2011)
Edward Joseph Adams (22 February 2011 - 8 April 2017)
Savio Hon Tai-Fai (28 September 2017 - 24 October 2022)
Jan Romeo Pawłowski (1 December 2022 - present)

See also
Foreign relations of the Holy See
List of diplomatic missions of the Holy See

References

Greece
 
Greece–Holy See relations